Claudia Calvo Salas (born 23 July 1994), artistically known as Claudia Salas is a Spanish actress. She gained notoriety for her performance as Rebe in Elite.

Biography 
Claudia Calvo Salas was born in Madrid on 23 July 1994. She studied acting at the Arte4 Drama School in Madrid. Her first television opportunity was a minor role in the period soap opera Seis hermanas. Cast as Rebe in the second season of the teen drama series Elite, she played a quintessential choni, resulting into a breakthrough performance after the 2019 release. She then featured as Escalante in the second season of La peste, a performance which earned her a Best New Actress nomination at the 29th Actors and Actresses Union Awards. Salas returned as Rebe in seasons three, four and five of Elite and featured as one of the antagonists in the 2022 horror thriller film Piggy. In February 2022, she joined alongside Ricardo Gómez, Elisabet Casanovas and Àlex Monner the main cast of The Route, a period series about the so-called .

Filmography

Films and television

Accolades

References 

21st-century Spanish actresses
Spanish television actresses
Spanish film actresses
1994 births
Living people
Actresses from Madrid